Charles H. "Duke" Esper (July 28, 1867 – August 31, 1910) was a professional baseball player who played pitcher in the Major Leagues from 1890 to 1898. Esper played for the Philadelphia Athletics, Pittsburgh Pirates, Philadelphia Phillies, Baltimore Orioles, Washington Senators, and St. Louis Browns. Esper pitched 1727.2 innings, winning 101 games and losing 100.

References

External links

1868 births
1910 deaths
Major League Baseball pitchers
Baseball players from New Jersey
19th-century baseball players
Philadelphia Athletics (AA) players
Pittsburgh Pirates players
Washington Senators (1891–1899) players
St. Louis Browns (NL) players
Baltimore Orioles (NL) players
Philadelphia Phillies players
Smyrna (minor league baseball) players
Millville (minor league baseball) players
Hartford Indians players
Toronto Maple Leafs (International League) players
People from Salem, New Jersey
Sportspeople from Salem County, New Jersey